Mykola Kvasnyi (born 4 January 1995) is a Ukrainian footballer who plays as a defender for Veres Rivne.

Career
Kvasnyi is a product of the two Kyivan youth sportive schools. His first trainer was Mykola Lytovchak in FC Knyazha Shchaslyve.

From July 2012 until 2014 Kvasnyi played in the Ukrainian Premier League Reserves for clubs FC Arsenal Kyiv and SC Tavriya Simferopol. From July 2014 he continued his career in the Ukrainian Premier League Reserves club FC Vorskla Poltava. And in summer 2015 Kvasnyi was promoted to the main-squad team of FC Vorskla in the Ukrainian Premier League. He made his debut for Vorskla Poltava in the Ukrainian Premier League in a match against FC Dynamo Kyiv on 4 October 2015.

References

External links

1995 births
Living people
People from Dolyna
Ukrainian footballers
Association football defenders
FC Vorskla Poltava players
PFC Sumy players
FC Lviv players
FC Inhulets Petrove players
FC Prykarpattia Ivano-Frankivsk (1998) players
NK Veres Rivne players
Ukrainian Premier League players
Ukrainian First League players
Ukraine youth international footballers
Sportspeople from Ivano-Frankivsk Oblast
20th-century Ukrainian people
21st-century Ukrainian people

Births in Dolyna